Villem Kapp (7 September 1913 – 24 March 1964) was an Estonian composer, organist and music teacher.

Life
Born in Suure-Jaani, Estonia, Villem Kapp was the son of  who was a sacristan, teacher and choir director.

Villem Kapp graduated in 1938, having studied organ with August Topman and again in 1944 having studied composition with Heino Eller. In addition, Kapp studied with his uncle Artur Kapp at the Tallinn Conservatory.

From 1938 Kapp was the organist in Tartu where he ran many famous choirs. After World War II he worked mainly as a composer and taught composition at the State Conservatory of Tallinn from 1944 until his untimely death in 1964. His students included Helmut Rosenvald, Lembit Veevo, Ülo Vinter, Veljo Tormis, Harri Otsa and others.

Villem Kapp's works are characterized by rich melodies and he is strongly connected to the national romantic movement. In 1950, Kapp was awarded the State Prize of the Estonian SSR and, in 1963, he was awarded the People's Artist of the Estonian Soviet Socialist Republic.

In 1971 a museum was opened in Suure-Jaani dedicated to the life and work of the Kapp family musicians, including Kapp, his uncle Artur Kapp and his cousin Eugen Kapp.

Works 
Incomplete List:
 Ööpoeem (for Symphony Orchestra, 1942)
 Põhjarannik (Heroic Choral Poem, 1958)
 Lembitu (Opera, 1961) - Perhaps Kapp's Magnum Opus; An historical opera based on Estonia's fight for independence in the 13th century, including the Battle of St. Matthew's Day and the eponymous Estonian elder of Sakala County and military leader. The ancient Sakala County included the areas where Kapp grew up, so the themes were particularly close to his heart.
 Kevadele (Cantata, 1963)

In addition to these, Kapp also wrote two symphonies (In 1947 and 1955), as well as more than sixty choral and solo songs.

Partial discography 
 Symphony No. 2 - on "Baltic Voyage: Heroic Symphonies From Estonia", Neeme Järvi and the BBC Philharmonic Orchestra. 
 Elegie - on "Silent Moods", Juha Kangas and the Ostrobothnian Chamber Orchestra.
 Põhjarannik - on "Neeme Jarvi: 70th Birthday Jubilee", Neeme Järvi, Kristjan Järvi, Estonian National Male Choir & Symphony Orchestra.

Bibliography 
 Helga Tõnson: Villem Kapp. Tallinn 1967

References

External links

1913 births
1964 deaths
People from Suure-Jaani
People from Kreis Fellin
Estonian conductors (music)
Male classical composers
20th-century classical composers
Estonian music educators
20th-century Estonian composers
20th-century conductors (music)
20th-century male musicians
Soviet composers
Academic staff of the Estonian Academy of Music and Theatre
People's Artists of the Estonian Soviet Socialist Republic